Aleksandr Andreyevich Perchenok (born 28 November 1992) is a Russian football forward who plays for FC Sokol Saratov.

Club career
He made his debut in the Russian Second Division for FC Sokol Saratov on 29 June 2011 in a game against FC Gubkin.

He made his Russian Football National League debut for Sokol on 3 August 2015 in a game against FC Volga Nizhny Novgorod.

References

External links
 
 

1992 births
Sportspeople from Saratov
Living people
Russian footballers
Association football forwards
FC Sokol Saratov players
FC Olimp-Dolgoprudny players